The Philippine warty pig (Sus philippensis) is one of four known species in the pig genus (Sus) endemic to the Philippines. The other three endemic species are the Visayan warty pig (S. cebifrons), Mindoro warty pig (S. oliveri) and the Palawan bearded pig (S. ahoenobarbus), also being rare members of the family Suidae. Philippine warty pigs have two pairs of warts, with a tuft of hair extending outwards from the warts closest to the jaw. It has multiple native common names, but it is most widely known as baboy damo ("bush pig") in Tagalog.

Subspecies
There are at least two recognized subspecies of the Philippine warty pig:
 S. p. philippensis (from Luzon and nearby islands)
 S. p. mindanensis (from Mindanao)

Distribution and habitat
In general, the original distribution of S. philippensis covered the western islands of the Philippines, while the original distribution of S. cebifrons covered the central and eastern islands. Specifically, the range of Philippine warty pigs included Luzon, Biliran, Samar, Leyte, Mindoro, Mindanao, Jolo, Polillo, Catanduanes, and possibly other islands. The warty pigs in Lubang Island and its outlying islands may be a distinct species. Moreover, it was formerly found in most habitats (from sea level to up to 2800 m) but is now confined to remote forests due to loss of habitat and heavy hunting by noose traps or trigger set bullets.

Wild pigs have been reported in Bohol and Sibuyan, although it is unclear whether these populations are S. cebifrons or S. philippensis. In April 2022, a Philippine warty pig was documented by a Department of Environment and Natural Resources (DENR) team while climbing Mount Apo.

Genetic relation to other pigs (Suidae)
It is closely related to the Bornean bearded pig (Sus barbatus), and in fact was once thought to be a subspecies (i.e., S. b. philippensis) like the Palawan bearded pig (S. b. ahoenobarbus). The Palawan bearded pig is now also frequently classified not as a subspecies, but as a separate Philippine endemic pig species, S. ahoenobarbus.

Hybridization
With loss of its natural habitat from deforestation and uncontrolled logging and hunting, they have been forced into close contact with domestic pigs (Sus scrofa domestica) (the domesticated variety of the non-endemic Eurasian wild boar), and hybridization between the two species has been reported. Accordingly, genetic contamination of Philippine warty pig stock is a real and irreversible problem.

See also
 Wild pigs of the Philippines

References

External links
Classification
Sus philippensis of Philippine Mamillian Fauna

Pigs, Peccaries, and Hippos Specialist Group

Sus (genus)
Mammals of the Philippines
Endemic fauna of the Philippines
Mammals described in 1886